Japan Museum SieboldHuis (Siebold House) is a museum located at the  in Leiden, Netherlands. It displays items that were collected by Philipp Franz von Siebold (1796-1866) between 1823 and 1829 during his stay at Dejima, the Dutch trade colony nearby Nagasaki in Japan. It also functions as a museum of Japanese culture.

Siebold was highly interested in all aspects of Japanese nature and culture, and as such his collection is very diverse. Japan Museum SieboldHuis has a permanent exhibition of maps, rocks, animals, plants, utensils and art. Temporary exhibitions offer a varied selection of Japanese art.

The monumental house is property of the Dutch government and used to house the cantonal court.

Gallery

See also 
 Philipp Franz von Siebold: Siebold museums

External links 

  

Museums in Leiden
Museums of Japanese art
Museums of Japanese culture